My Kuya's Wedding is a 2007 Philippine romantic comedy film directed by Topel Lee and starring Maja Salvador, Pauleen Luna and Ryan Agoncillo.

Plot
A younger sister (Maja Salvador) tries to ruin her brother's wedding because she knows that he will leave her alone after he marries his fiancée. She tries to concoct a scene by following her brother's pamamanhikan in the province, revealing further details about the woman's family.

Cast

 Ryan Agoncillo as Kuya Jeff
 Maja Salvador as Kat
 Pauleen Luna as Heidi
 Jason Abalos as Aris
 Say Alonzo as Yvette
 Dick Israel as Peng
 Ethel Booba as Susie
 Janus del Prado as Colin
 Dominic Ochoa as Divo
 IC Mendoza as Vi
 Kitkat as Jopay
 Paul Salas as Young Jeff
 Frank Garcia as Rudy
 Ryan Yllana as Farrel
 Debraliz as Tere
 Raquel Villavicencio as Elsa
 Cheena Crab as Pepay
 Cheska Billiones as Young Kitkat
 Mika Dela Cruz as Young Yvette
 Jorel Tan as TV Reporter

Reception

References

External links

2007 romantic comedy-drama films
2007 films
Filipino-language films
Philippine romantic comedy-drama films
Regal Entertainment films
2000s Tagalog-language films
2007 drama films
Films directed by Topel Lee